The 2023 Atlantic Championship Series season will be the tenth season of the revived Atlantic Championship. The series is organized by Formula Race Promotions and sanctioned by SCCA Pro Racing.

The season is scheduled to be held over five weekends from March to August 2023.

Drivers 
Drivers will compete in two classes, either in the 016 Class or in the Open Class.

016 Class entries

Open Class entries

Race calendar 
The schedule was announced on October 12, 2022. The series will not return to Barber Motorsports Park, instead opting for a round at Summit Point Motorsports Park for the first time since 2018.

Results

Standings

Scoring system 
Three points are awarded for pole position in each class, as well as two more points for the fastest lap per race per class.

016 Class standings

Open Class standings

See also 

 2023 F2000 Championship Series
 2023 F1600 Championship Series

References

External links 

 

Atlantic Championship
Atlantic Championship
Atlantic Championship seasons
2023 in formula racing